STS-5 was the fifth NASA Space Shuttle mission and the fifth flight of the Space Shuttle Columbia. It launched on November 11, 1982, and landed five days later on November 16, 1982. STS-5 was the first Space Shuttle mission to deploy communications satellites into orbit, and the first officially "operational" Space Shuttle mission.

Crew

Support crew 
 Roy D. Bridges Jr. (entry CAPCOM)
 Michael Coats
 Richard O. Covey
 Bryan D. O'Connor
 Jon McBride
 Robert L. Stewart (ascent CAPCOM)

Crew seating arrangements

Mission summary 
Columbia launched on schedule from Kennedy Space Center (KSC) at 07:19:00a.m. EST, on November 11, 1982. The shuttle carried a crew of four – the largest spacecraft crew up to that time – and the first two commercial communications satellites to be flown aboard a shuttle.

The commercial satellites were deployed successfully and subsequently propelled into their operational geosynchronous orbits by McDonnell Douglas PAM-D kick motors. The two satellites were SBS-3, owned by Satellite Business Systems, and Anik-C3, owned by Telesat Canada; both were Hughes-built HS-376-series satellites. In addition, STS-5 carried a West German-sponsored microgravity Getaway Special (GAS) experiment canister in the payload bay. The crew also conducted three student-designed experiments during the flight.

Lenoir and Allen were to perform a spacewalk, the first of the Space Shuttle program, to test newly developed space suits. The space suits were developed as cheaper and less complicated alternatives to the Apollo versions. The test was delayed by one day due to Lenoir succumbing to motion sickness. Then a poorly functioning oxygen regulator in Lenoir's suit and a broken recirculation fan in Allen's caused them to cancel the extravehicular activity (EVA) entirely. It was the first time in the history of the space program that an EVA had been cancelled due to space suit issues.

Columbia landed on Runway 22 at Edwards Air Force Base on November 16, 1982, at 06:33:26a.m. PST, having traveled  in 81 orbits during a mission that lasted 5days, 2hours, 14minutes and 26seconds. Columbia was returned to KSC on November 22, 1982. STS-5 was the first Space Shuttle flight in which the crew did not wear pressure suits for the launch, reentry, and landing portions of the flight, similar to the Soviet Voskhod and Soyuz missions prior to the ill-fated Soyuz 11 mission in 1971.

Operational status 
The Space Shuttle was formally declared "operational" after STS-4. However, the Columbia Accident Investigation Board (CAIB), in its report on the loss with all crew aboard of Columbia during STS-107 in 2003, asserted that the orbiter should never have been considered operational and that, while not intrinsically unsafe, it was in fact an experimental vehicle. The CAIB's rationale was that civilian and military aircraft that are considered operational must have been tested and proven over thousands of safe flights in their final operational configurations, whereas the shuttle had conducted under 200 flights, with continuous modification. NASA operated the Space Shuttle as an experimental vehicle for the remainder of the program.

Mission insignia 
The five points of the blue star of the mission patch indicate the flight's numerical designation in the Space Transportation System's mission sequence.

Wake-up calls 
NASA began a tradition of playing music to astronauts during the Project Gemini, and first used music to wake up a flight crew during Apollo 15. Each track is specially chosen, often by the astronauts' families, and usually has a special meaning to an individual member of the crew, or is applicable to their daily activities.

Gallery

See also 

 List of human spaceflights
 List of Space Shuttle missions
 Space Shuttle Columbia disaster

References

External links 

 STS-5 mission summary. NASA.
 STS-5 video highlights . NSS.

Space Shuttle missions
Edwards Air Force Base
Spacecraft launched in 1982
1982 in California
1982 in Florida
Spacecraft which reentered in 1982
November 1982 events